Igor Medeiros de Melo Alves (born April 4, 1988 in Rio de Janeiro), or simply Igor Alves, is a Brazilian football (soccer) midfielder who currently plays for Sergipe.

Career

Club
In August 2011, he joined Associação Olímpica de Itabaiana on one and a half year contract.

Honours
 Nedbank Cup: 2009

References

External links
Profile at Soccerway
 
 Player's profile at Moroka Swallows

1988 births
Living people
Association football midfielders
Moroka Swallows F.C. players
Widzew Łódź players
CR Flamengo footballers
Centro de Futebol Zico players
Associação Olímpica de Itabaiana players
Bangu Atlético Clube players
Paragominas Futebol Clube players
Club Sportivo Sergipe players
Ekstraklasa players
South African Premier Division players
Campeonato Brasileiro Série D players
Footballers from Rio de Janeiro (city)
Brazilian footballers
Brazilian expatriate footballers
Expatriate footballers in Poland
Expatriate soccer players in South Africa
Brazilian expatriate sportspeople in Poland
Brazilian expatriate sportspeople in South Africa